Kanwarpal Tathgur (born 5 August 1993) is a Canadian cricketer. In October 2019, he was named as the captain of Canada's squad for the 2019–20 Regional Super50 tournament in the West Indies. He made his List A debut on 8 November 2019, for Canada against the Leeward Islands, in the Regional Super50 tournament.

References

External links
 

1993 births
Living people
Canadian cricketers
Place of birth missing (living people)